Ruddles Mills is an unincorporated community in Bourbon County, Kentucky. It was established by Captain Isaac Ruddell as a mill. The site is located where Hinkston Creek and Stoner Creek join to form the South Fork of the Licking River (not to be confused with Ruddles Station).

References

External links
Kentucky Atlas profile of Ruddles Mill

Unincorporated communities in Bourbon County, Kentucky
Unincorporated communities in Kentucky